Owen may  refer to:

People and fictional characters 
 Owen (name), including a list of people and fictional characters with the given name or surname

Places

United States
 Owen, Indiana
 Owen, Missouri, a ghost town
 Owen, Wisconsin
 Owen County, Indiana
 Owen County, Kentucky
 Owen Township (disambiguation)
 Mount Owen (Colorado)
 Mount Owen (Wyoming)

Elsewhere
 Owen Island, South Shetland Islands, Antarctica
 Owen Sound, a city in Ontario, Canada
 Owen, South Australia, a small town
 Owen, Germany, town in Baden-Württemberg
 Mount Owen (disambiguation)
 Port Owen, South Africa

Ships
 , a destroyer that took part in World War II and the Korean War
 , a British Royal Navy frigate

Other uses
 Owen (automobile), an American car made from 1910 to 1914
 Owen (musician), a solo project of American indie rock singer-songwriter Mike Kinsella
 Owen (album), a 2001 album
 Owen (hippopotamus), a young orphan hippopotamus who formed a bond with a giant tortoise
 Owen gun, an Australian World War II submachine gun
 Owen Graduate School of Management, the graduate business school of Vanderbilt University

See also 
 Owen Fracture Zone, a transform fault which runs along the eastern boundary of the Arabian Plate, separating it from the Indo-Australian Plate
 Owen Owen, UK department store chain
 D.R. Owen (shipwreck), a schooner that was shipwrecked in Lake Superior in 1874 
 Owen's (disambiguation)
 Owens (disambiguation)
 Eógan (given name), pronounced Owen, Irish-Scottish version of the given name
 Owain (disambiguation)